All Eyes to the Morning Sun is a mini-album by Lights Action. It was released on April 14, 2008 as a digital download and also as an enhanced CD.

Track listing

Enhanced CD
The enhanced cd track list is as above but includes the videos for the singles; "Satellites", "Story Of A Broken Boy" & "Aurora"

Credits

Patrick Currier - vocals, Cover Illustration
Karl Bareham - Guitar, Layout & Design
Chris Moorhead - Guitar/Keys
Alex Leeder - Bass
Steven Durham - drums
Richard Wilkinson - Producer, Mixing (At The Pierce Rooms)
Daniel Morrison - Additional Vocal Engineering at The Pierce Rooms
Simon Hayes - Mayfair Assistant
Toshi Minesaki - Mayfair Assistant
Dave Terry - Mayfair Assistant
Fred Vessey - Britannia Row Assistant
Emma Hampson-Jones - Band Photography
Phil Smith Design - Crest

References

Lights Action albums
2008 EPs